José Ángel Valdés Díaz (born 5 September 1989), known as José Ángel or Cote, is a Spanish professional footballer who plays for Sporting de Gijón as a left-back.

Club career

Sporting Gijón
Born in Gijón, Asturias, José Ángel was a product of hometown Sporting de Gijón's prolific youth system, Mareo. He made his first-team and La Liga debut on 8 February 2009, in a 3–1 away loss against FC Barcelona. He went on to feature regularly for the duration of the season as the side narrowly avoided a drop, adding a goal in a 3–2 home win over Deportivo de La Coruña.

In 2009–10, José Ángel again played 13 games for the first team as they retained once again their top-division status (15th position). In the following campaigns, he continued battling for position with another club youth graduate, Roberto Canella, with both players appearing in roughly the same number of matches.

Roma
On 19 July 2011, Serie A club A.S. Roma reached an agreement with Sporting Gijón for the transfer of José Ángel, joining compatriot Luis Enrique who had just been appointed team manager. The former paid €4.5 million for his services, plus bonuses. He made his competitive debut on 11 September, being sent off in a 1–2 home loss against Cagliari Calcio.

José Ángel spent the 2012–13 and 2013–14 seasons on loan to Real Sociedad, mainly acting as backup to Alberto de la Bella during his spell.

Porto
In July 2014, José Ángel joined FC Porto for free, with Roma being eligible to receive 50% of any future transfer fee. He appeared in 28 competitive games during his two-year spell in Portugal, his Primeira Liga debut arriving on 31 August 2014 in a 3–0 home defeat of Moreirense FC (90 minutes played).

José Ángel was loaned to Villarreal CF on 25 July 2016, for one year.

Later career
On 14 July 2017, José Ángel signed a three-year contract with SD Eibar as a free agent. On 5 July 2021, after suffering relegation, he joined CA Osasuna on a two-year deal.

José Ángel returned to his first club Sporting in July 2022, on a two-year contract.

International career
José Ángel earned four caps for the Spain under-21 team, his debut coming in 2009. He was selected by manager Luis Milla to the squad that appeared – and won – the 2011 UEFA European Championship in Denmark, being an unused member as RCD Espanyol's Dídac Vilà played all the matches and minutes.

Career statistics

Club

Honours
Spain U20
Mediterranean Games: 2009

Spain U21
UEFA European Under-21 Championship: 2011

References

External links

1989 births
Living people
Spanish footballers
Footballers from Gijón
Association football defenders
La Liga players
Segunda División players
Segunda División B players
Sporting de Gijón B players
Sporting de Gijón players
Real Sociedad footballers
Villarreal CF players
SD Eibar footballers
CA Osasuna players
Serie A players
A.S. Roma players
Primeira Liga players
FC Porto players
Spain youth international footballers
Spain under-21 international footballers
Competitors at the 2009 Mediterranean Games
Mediterranean Games medalists in football
Mediterranean Games gold medalists for Spain
Spanish expatriate footballers
Expatriate footballers in Italy
Expatriate footballers in Portugal
Spanish expatriate sportspeople in Italy
Spanish expatriate sportspeople in Portugal